All Souled Out is the debut EP by Pete Rock & CL Smooth. It was released in the summer of 1991 to rave reviews and spawned a modest hit in "The Creator".

After participation in the production and/or remixes of songs by various hip hop and R&B artists in the late 1980s to early 1990s, the duo signed to Elektra Records.  All Souled Out was a warm up to their debut album, Mecca and the Soul Brother. All the rapping on the album is performed by C.L. Smooth with the exception of "The Creator", a Pete Rock solo track. A deluxe edition of All Souled Out was released on February 18, 2014 on Traffic Entertainment Group, featuring the original 6 EP tracks, along with remix and instrumental versions of "The Creator" & "Mecca & the Soul Brother".

Track listing

Album singles

Charts

References

1990 EPs
Hip hop EPs
Pete Rock & CL Smooth albums
Albums produced by Pete Rock
Albums recorded at Greene St. Recording